Ariel Cortazzo (1915–1998) was an Argentine screenwriter.

Selected filmography
 The Tango Star (1940)
 Girls Orchestra (1941)
 Melodies of America (1941)
 The Three Rats (1946)
 María Rosa (1946)
 Story of a Bad Woman (1948)
 The Honourable Tenant (1951)
 Spring of Life (1957)
 Arm in Arm Down the Street (1966)

References

Bibliography
 Cowie, Peter. World Filmography. Tantivy Press, 1968.

External links

1915 births
1998 deaths
People from Buenos Aires
20th-century Argentine screenwriters
20th-century Argentine male writers